Rickie Freeman for Teri Jon is an American luxury fashion designer for women's clothing.
Rickie Freeman founded Teri Jon (day and eveningwear collections) and JÔN (a sportswear collection). Although Teri Jon is based in New York City, it sold its products to many department and boutiques stores across the U.S. including Bloomingdale's, Neiman Marcus, Nordstroms, Saks Fifth Avenue and Lord and Taylor. In the past, it opened its own stores across the U.S, including in Woodbury Commons, NY and in Dallas, Texas.

References

External links
 http://www.terijon.com

American fashion designers